Jason Donald (born January 30, 1980 in Winter Park, Colorado) is an elite men's road bicycle racing professional from Brighton, Colorado. Donald last rode for the  team, and is the former NCCA Road Champion.

Major results 
2007 – 
 2nd, Prologue (ITT), Tour of California
 2nd, Prologue (ITT), Tour of the Bahamas
2006 – Team Einstein's Cycling
 1st, Stage 5, Tour of the Gila
 3rd, Overall, La Vuelta de Bisbee
 5th, Overall, Joe Martin Stage Race
 Stage 5 Most Aggressive Rider, Nature Valley Grand Prix
2005 – RMCEF
 5th, Bob Cook Memorial Mt Evans Hillclimb

References
 

1980 births
Living people
American male cyclists
People from Grand County, Colorado